Park City Center is a shopping mall located in Lancaster, Pennsylvania, and is the largest enclosed shopping center in Lancaster County. It is situated at the intersection of U.S. Route 30 and Harrisburg Pike. The mall has over 170 stores and the anchor stores are Round 1 Entertainment, Kohl's, JCPenney, and Boscov's. There is one vacant anchor store that was once The Bon-Ton.

With 170 stores, Park City Center is currently the fourth largest shopping mall in Pennsylvania.

History
The mall originally opened in 1971.  The shape of the mall resembles a snowflake, with its stores occupying 8 corridors extending from the center. The roof in the center of the mall is a large white tent, and encloses the octagonal Center Court. The mall underwent a major renovation in 2008, which took 18 months and included updates to every part of the mall. During its early years Park City was also called "Mall of Four Seasons" because of the seasonal names given to the 4 corridors leading to each anchor. Going clockwise from west to east was JCPenney in the two-story Winter quadrant, Sears (closed March 10, 2019) in Spring, Gimbel's (future Pomeroy's/Boscov's) in Summer and Watt & Shand (later Bon-Ton, now closed) in Autumn. The high tech mall located in the heart of Pennsylvania Dutch Country was one of the first to have its own closed-circuit television. Studios for Park City Communications and Lancaster/York/Harrisburg CBS affiliate WLYH-TV 15 were located on the first floor in the Winter wing alongside an ice skating rink.

The mall is a major shopping destination for shoppers in the south-central Pennsylvania area due to its assortment of over 170 stores, all of which are newly renovated and most of which are not offered at the nearby Berkshire Mall and York Galleria.

The mall had only the second location of Lancaster department store Watt & Shand. The lifestyle center portion of the mall, Fountain Shoppes, is accessible from the main level. The mall's only fountain can be found here. The mall has had no indoor fountains for over 25 years.

The Bon-Ton store at the mall closed in 2018 as part of that chain's liquidation. On December 28, 2018, it was announced that Sears would be closing as part of a plan to close 80 stores nationwide. The store closed in March 2019. In August 2019, it was announced that Round One Entertainment would take over the former Sears space, opening in 2020. In 2019, the mall announced plans to demolish the former Bon-Ton and replace it with two freestanding restaurants and a new mall entrance. However plans were put on hold, and in March 2021 Vaccinate Lancaster opened in the space as a mass COVID-19 vaccination site.

On October 17, 2021, a shooting reportedly took place at the mall causing it to be placed on lockdown. No injuries were reported.

In November 2022, a deer entered the mall and eventually wound up in the fitting room at JCPenney.

References

External links

 

Brookfield Properties
Shopping malls in Pennsylvania
Shopping malls established in 1971
Buildings and structures in Lancaster, Pennsylvania
Tourist attractions in Lancaster, Pennsylvania
1971 establishments in Pennsylvania